The Basketball Tournament (TBT) is an open-application, single-elimination tournament played each summer in the United States. The 2022 edition features 64 teams with a $1 million winner-take-all prize, broadcast by ESPN. TBT was founded in 2014 by Jonathan Mugar.

Format 
Teams in TBT are arranged by the general manager, sometimes based on which college basketball program the players competed for. The tournament has had as many as 97 teams, in 2015, and as few as 24 teams, in 2020. Since 2016, the tournament has most often used a 64-team field. In 2019, the 64 teams were divided into eight regions, with each regional winner advancing to the championship venue. In 2020, the tournament field was reduced to 24 teams with all games played at a single venue, due to the COVID-19 pandemic in the United States. In 2021, the 64 teams were organized into four regions, with each region's top two teams advancing to the championship venue. The 2022 event returned to the former eight-region format, with the eight regional winners advancing to what TBT organizers call "Championship Week", with quarterfinals at two sites followed by semifinals and the final at the championship venue.

The championship prize money was originally $500,000 in 2014, was increased to $1 million in 2015, and was $2 million from 2016 through 2019. Since 2020, the top prize has been $1 million. The prize money goes to the winning team's personnel.
There are also prizes for the top 1,000 bracket entries submitted by fans that score the most points through their picks, on a deescalating scale starting at $4,000 for the winner. The 2019 tournament included prizes other than the overall winner-take-all purse; each regional winner received 25% of its region's ticket proceeds.

 Defending champion received a play-in to the round-of-16
 Four teams in the field of 64 select via a 16-team two-round play-in

Rules

TBT uses a modified version of NCAA men's basketball rules. As of the 2019 edition, the most significant exceptions were:
 Games are played in 9-minute quarters instead of 20-minute halves (or the 10-minute quarters of the NCAA women's game).
 Players foul out upon their 6th personal foul (instead of 5th).
 Bonus free throws follow NCAA women's and FIBA rules, with two free throws on the 5th and subsequent non-shooting fouls by the defense in a quarter. An exception to this rule was added starting with the 2020 tournament; any foul during the Elam Ending (see below) that would result in bonus free throws will instead give the non-fouling team one free throw and possession of the ball.
 FIBA rules on basket interference are followed, except on free throws. Once the ball hits the rim on a field goal attempt, any player on either team can play the ball, regardless of the direction in which it is moving or its position relative to the basket. The only exception is that no player on either team may touch a shot that was in the air at the time the game clock expired for any quarter, even if the ball has touched the rim, as long as it has a chance to enter the basket.
 Replay review is governed by NCAA rules, with one modification—any review allowed only in the last two minutes of a game under NCAA rules is allowed in TBT only if either team is within three points of the Elam Ending target score.
 Due to the adoption of the Elam Ending for all games, there is no overtime.

Players 
TBT has had a number of current and former NBA players participate, including Hakim Warrick, Jason Williams, Dahntay Jones, Mike Bibby, Royal Ivey, Matt Bonner, Jimmer Fredette, and Brian Scalabrine. Former WNBA player Nikki Teasley played in the 2014 tournament. The 2018 tournament included the basketball return of Greg Oden, who last played in the Chinese Basketball Association during their 2015–16 season. The 2019 tournament had been expected to be the first to feature an active female professional. Megan Gustafson, who had been cut by the Dallas Wings before the 2019 WNBA season, was slated to play for Iowa United, a team made up primarily of alumni of the state's four NCAA Division I schools. However, due to a rash of early-season injuries on the team, the Wings re-signed her in mid-June, ruling her out of TBT.

Many teams feature professional players reunited under a former college or university name, with teams representing Arkansas, Bradley, Buffalo, Cincinnati, Dayton, Georgetown, Gonzaga, Iowa State, Kansas State, Marquette, Marshall, Milwaukee, Notre Dame, Ohio State, Purdue, Seton Hall, Syracuse, Texas Tech, UCLA, VCU, West Virginia, Wichita State, Xavier and many others. Teams have received fan support from active NBA players such as Kyle Lowry and Obi Toppin. Five alumni teams have won TBT—Buffalo, Marquette, Notre Dame, Ohio State, and Syracuse.

In 2016, NBA players such as John Wall, Kristaps Porzingis, Rudy Gay, Shaun Livingston, Chandler Parsons, and Austin Rivers served as boosters for different teams. In 2017, Carmelo Anthony acted as host for the tournament in Baltimore, where he played high school basketball. 2019 saw even more NBA involvement, with Chris Paul (Team CP3) and DeMarcus Cousins (Loyalty Is Love) both entering teams, while Bobby Portis and Andre Drummond coached TBT sides.

Bracket celebration 
At the conclusion of each game, the winning team advances its placard on a giant bracket to the next round. The bracket resembles the All Valley Karate Tournament bracket found in The Karate Kid.

After pleas from ESPN analyst Fran Fraschilla, Yahoo Sports columnist Jeff Eisenberg, and SportsCenter host Scott Van Pelt, the NCAA adopted the ritual for March Madness in 2018. After the game, a portable bracket was brought into the winning team's locker room. One player, or a group of players, advanced the team to the next round. Oftentimes, the celebration was posted on social media. The bracket celebration also took place in the Frozen Four of the 2018 NCAA Hockey Tournament.

Champions 
On June 28, 2014, Notre Dame Fighting Alumni won the inaugural TBT championship, defeating Team Barstool, 72–68. The winning team, represented by several former Fighting Irish players, including MVP Tyrone Nash, donated $40,000 to Coaches vs. Cancer.

On August 2, 2015, Overseas Elite defeated Team 23, 67–65, to take the second annual TBT title. D. J. Kennedy, who played college basketball for St. John's, was named MVP.

Overseas Elite was able to repeat as TBT champions by defeating Team Colorado, 77–72, on August 2, 2016, to claim the $2 million prize; Arizona alumnus Kyle Fogg was named MVP.

On August 3, 2017, Overseas Elite beat Team Challenge ALS, 86–83, to become three-time TBT champions, with Fogg again being named MVP.

On August 3, 2018, Overseas Elite won their fourth consecutive final, defeating Eberlein Drive, 70–58, with D. J. Kennedy being named MVP for the second time.

The 2019 final was played on August 6 between two teams consisting mainly of alumni of single NCAA Division I programs, with Carmen's Crew (Ohio State) defeating Golden Eagles (Marquette), 66–60. William Buford of Carmen's Crew was named MVP.

The 2020 final, played on July 14 in Columbus, Ohio, matched Golden Eagles, appearing in their second consecutive TBT title game, and Sideline Cancer, who defeated four-time champion Overseas Elite to reach their first title game. The game was won by Golden Eagles, 78–73. Darius Johnson-Odom of the Golden Eagles was named MVP.

The 2021 final was held on August 3 in Dayton, Ohio, with Boeheim's Army (Syracuse) defeating Team 23, 69–67; the winning shot was made by Keifer Sykes. Team 23 became the first team to lose two TBT finals. Tyrese Rice of Boeheim's Army was named MVP.

The 2022 final was held on August 2, again in Dayton, between Blue Collar U (Buffalo) and Americana for Autism. Blue Collar U outscored Americana for Autism in every quarter and won the game, 89–67. The winning points came on a dunk by Montell McRae. C. J. Massinburg of Blue Collar U was named MVP.

Championship game records

Teams are ordered by number of appearances.

Related venture 
On October 11, 2022, tournament owner and organizer TBT Enterprises announced that it would extend the TBT concept to soccer, announcing The Soccer Tournament, a 7-on-7 summer tournament planned to begin in 2023. Like TBT, TST will have a winner-take-all prize of $1 million. TST is intended to start with 32 teams, with a group phase followed by a 16-team knockout tournament. Matches will be played on a reduced-size field with slightly smaller goals than normal and will consist of 20-minute halves. The Elam Ending has been adapted to a soccer setting; after the end of the second half, the remainder of the match consists of "Target Score Time", with the target score being set by adding one goal to the leading (or tied) team's score. The game ends once the target score is reached by either team. If the target is not reached after 5 minutes, one player from each team exits the field, with the process continuing every 5 minutes until the winning goal is scored.

References

External links 

Elam Ending description

 
Annual sporting events in the United States
Recurring sporting events established in 2014
Basketball competitions in the United States
Basketball competitions in Los Angeles
Basketball competitions in Chicago
Basketball competitions in Charlotte, North Carolina
Basketball competitions in Philadelphia
2014 establishments in the United States
Sports leagues established in 2014